"Touch My Fire" is the fifth single by British R&B star Javine (her first for Island Records), serving as the  entry for the Eurovision Song Contest 2005. It was the first new material from Javine since her debut album, Surrender, was released in 2004.

The single reached the #18 in the UK singles chart, her fifth consecutive top 20 hit. The version on the single, however, was slightly different from the one that appeared on the Eurovision Song Contest 2005 album, with an extra verse and shorter dance break.

Charts

Formats and track listings
CD: 1
 Touch My Fire
 Touch My Fire (K-Gee Mix)

CD: 2
 Touch My Fire
 Touch My Fire (K-Gee Mix)
 Touch My Fire (Soulavengerz Get Your Groove On Mix)
 Touch My Fire (Video)

References

2005 singles
2005 songs
Eurovision songs of 2005
Eurovision songs of the United Kingdom
Island Records singles
Javine songs
Songs written by John Themis